The Yeshvantapur–Delhi Sarai Rohilla AC Duronto Express is a Superfast Express train of the Duronto Express category belonging to Indian Railways – South Western Railway zone that runs between  and  in India.

It operates as train number 12213 from Yesvantapur Junction to Delhi Sarai Rohilla and as train number 12214 in the reverse direction, serving the states of Karnataka, Andhra Pradesh, Telangana, Maharashtra, Madhya Pradesh, Uttar Pradesh & Delhi.

It is the only train which passes the major stations of  &  without halting at either of them.

Coaches

The 12213 / 14 Yeshvantapur–Delhi Sarai Rohilla Duronto Express presently has 1 AC 1st Class, 
1 AC 2 tier, 16 AC 3 tier & 2 End on Generator coaches. In addition, it also carries a pantry car.

As is customary with most train services in India, coach composition may be amended at the discretion of Indian Railways depending on demand.

Service

The 12213 Yeshvantapur–Delhi Sarai Rohilla Duronto Express covers the distance of 2367 kilometres in 31 hours 20 mins  & in 32 hours 55 mins as 12214 Delhi Sarai Rohilla–Yeshvantapur Duronto Express .

As the average speed of the train is above , as per Indian Railways rules, its fare includes a Superfast Express surcharge.

Time Table

Traction

Due to partial electrification, upon introduction until around 6 November 2017, the 12213 / 14 Yeshvantapur–Delhi Sarai Rohilla Duronto Express was hauled by a Krishnarajapuram-based WDP-4B/WDP-4D from Yeshvantapur Junction up to  handing over to a Lallaguda-based WAP-7 which would power the train up to its destination Delhi Sarai Rohilla.

With progressive electrification, it is now an end to end haul by a Lallaguda-based WAP-7.

Recently SWR's Krishnarajapuram (KJM) shed got WAP-7 from RPM shed and now this train runs end to end by Krishnarajapuram-based WAP-7 loco.

It is currently hauled by a Lallaguda-based WAP-7 locomotive on its entire journey.

Timings

12213 Yeshvantapur–Delhi Sarai Rohilla Duronto Express leaves Yeshvantapur Junction every Saturday at 23:40 hrs IST and reaches Delhi Sarai Rohilla at 07:00 hrs IST on the 3rd day.
12214 Delhi Sarai Rohilla–Yeshvantapur Duronto Express leaves Delhi Sarai Rohilla every Monday at 23:00 hrs IST and reaches Yeshvantapur Junction at 07:55 hrs IST on the 3rd day.

Gallery
Train Boards --->

Rake sharing

22677/22678 – Yesvantpur–Kochuveli AC Express

References

External links

Transport in Delhi
Transport in Bangalore
Rail transport in Maharashtra
Rail transport in Madhya Pradesh
Rail transport in Andhra Pradesh
Rail transport in Telangana
Rail transport in Uttar Pradesh
Duronto Express trains
Rail transport in Karnataka
Rail transport in Delhi
Railway services introduced in 2011